Loïc Vergnaud (born 1 December 1978) is a French Para-cyclist who represented France at the 2020 Summer Paralympics.

Career
Vergnaud represented France at 2021 UCI Para-cycling Road World Championships where he won silver in the road race H5 and road time trial H5 events.

Vergnaud represented France in the men's road time trial H5 event at the 2020 Summer Paralympics and won a silver medal. He also won a silver medal in the men's road race H5 event.

References

External links
 

Living people
1978 births
French male cyclists
Cyclists at the 2020 Summer Paralympics
Medalists at the 2020 Summer Paralympics
Paralympic medalists in cycling
Paralympic silver medalists for France
Paralympic cyclists of France
20th-century French people
21st-century French people